Ahkam ("rulings", plural of ) is an Islamic term with several meanings. In the Quran, the word hukm is variously used to mean arbitration, judgement, authority, or God's will. In the early Islamic period, the Kharijites gave it political connotations by declaring that they accept only the hukm of God. The word acquired new meanings in the course of Islamic history, being used to refer to worldly executive power or to a court decision.

In the plural, ahkam, it commonly refers to specific Quranic rules, or to the legal rulings derived using the methodology of fiqh. Sharia rulings fall into one of five categories known as "the five decisions" (al-aḥkām al-khamsa): mandatory (farḍ or wājib), recommended (mandūb or mustaḥabb), neutral/permissible (mubāḥ), reprehensible (makrūh), and forbidden (ḥarām).

Five ruling types
Sharia rulings fall into one of five categories known as “the five rulings”:

  - compulsory, obligatory
  - recommended
  - neutral, not involving God's judgment
  - disliked, reprehensible
  - forbidden

It is a sin or a crime to perform a forbidden action or not to perform a mandatory action. Reprehensible acts should be avoided, but they are not considered to be sinful or punishable in court. Avoiding reprehensible acts and performing recommended acts is held to be subject of reward in the afterlife, while allowed actions entail no judgement from God. Jurists disagree on whether the term ḥalāl covers the first three or the first four categories. The legal and moral verdict depends on whether the action is committed out of necessity (ḍarūra).

Examples of each ruling
Fard includes salat, Hajj, Islamic funeral, and responding to As-salamu alaykum(Islamic greeting). 
Mustahabb includes Sadaqah, shaving the pubic hair and armpit hair, and As-salamu alaykum.
Mubah includes, in property law, possessions without an owner.
Makruh includes divorce, profanity, consuming garlic before going to mosque, and using a lot of water for wudu.
Haram includes zina, riba, shirk, and consuming blood and forbidden foods.

General considerations

The ḥukm shar‘ī (aḥkām) in its literal sense carries the meaning of a rule of Islamic law. Thus aḥkām (rules) is the plural form of ḥukm (rule), which means rule, command, the absolute, order, judgment, injunction, prescription, and decree.  This rule could be a rule of any kind; it is to command one to delegate an order to another whether approval or disapproval. You could say that the moon is rising or the moon is not rising,  or that fire burns. Technically, it is considered a rule of Islamic law. Āmidī (d. 631/1234)  defines adillah as the science of the proofs of fiqh and the indications that they provide with regard to the aḥkām of the sharī‘ah. The ḥukm shar‘ī consists of four fundamental elements. These elements are: the Ḥākim (Lawgiver), the maḥkūm alayh (the subject), the maḥkūm fīh (the act of the mukallaf), and the ḥukm (ruling).

Emergency conditions
Religious precepts may be relaxed under certain extraordinary conditions. For example, although Muslims are required to fast during Ramadan, it is recommended for an ill man to break his fast if fasting will worsen his illness.

Fatwa
It is similar to but differs from a fatwa.

See also
 Supererogation, Western concept of virtue beyond ethical requirements
 , a similar typology in Anabaptist tradition

References

Notes

Citations

External links
Types of Hanafi Legal Rulings (Ahkam)

Arabic words and phrases in Sharia
Islamic jurisprudence
Sharia legal terminology
Islamic ethics